The National Canadian Liberation Monument (Dutch language: Nationaal Canadees Bevrijdingsmonument) is a Second World War monument in Apeldoorn, Netherlands, honouring the liberation of Holland.

Apeldoorn
World War II memorials in the Netherlands
Canadian military memorials and cemeteries